The Anguiped (Latin: angui, 'snake'; ped-, 'foot') is a kind of divinity that is often found on magical amulets from the Greco-Roman period, and is characterized by having serpents for legs.

Abraxas, the most common kind of Anguiped, is depicted as a creature with the head of a rooster and snakes for legs, symbolism thought to be of Persian origin. Sometimes inscribed below is Iao, a form of the Tetragrammaton – the four letters used to represent the name of the God of Judaism. Such amulets, as well as the repeated usage of the name Iao in magical papyri, curse tablets, gems, and other amulets, provide evidence of syncretic cults combining elements of Judaism with paganism. In the Talmud, people who turned away from Judaism to such cults are referred to as minim – often translated as "heretics" or "apostates".

In Graeco-Roman art, both Typhon and the giants (after around 380 BCE) are often conventionally depicted as anguipeds. A common religious motif in Roman Germany and eastern Gaul depicts an equestrian Jupiter riding down an anguipedal giant.

See also
 Snake-Legged Goddess

References

Further reading

 by Internet Archive on 26 May 2015.
 
  Two volumes:  (Vol. 1),  (Vol. 2).
 

Legendary creatures in classical mythology